Cannon Creek is a rural locality in the Scenic Rim Region, Queensland, Australia.

History 
St John's Anglican Church was dedicated on 18 November 1911 by Venerable Henry Le Fanu, the Archdeacon of Toowoomba. The land was donated by John Saville and other local people donated building materials and volunteered their labour. The church was at 691 Cannon Creek Road. It closed circa 1952. In 1976, the church was relocated to the Templin Historical Village.

Cannon Vale State School opened on 19 March 1917. It closed on 1956. The school was on Cannon Creek Road (approx ).

Cannon Creek was in Shire of Boonah until it was amalgamated into Scenic Rim Region in 2008.

The locality contained 39 households, in which 47.4% of the population were males and 52.6% of the population were females with a median age of 51, 13 years above the national average. The average weekly household income was $1,562, $124 above the national average.

Education 
There are no schools in the locality. The nearest primary schools are Boonah State School in Boonah to the north and Maroon State School in neighbouring Maroon to the south. The nearest secondary school is Boonah State High School in Boonah.

References

Further reading 
 

Scenic Rim Region
Localities in Queensland